Tosbotn or Tosbotnet is a village in the municipality of Brønnøy in Nordland county, Norway. The village is located at the end of the Tosenfjord arm of the Bindalsfjorden. The village is mostly a tourist center.

References

Brønnøy
Villages in Nordland